NGC 447 is a spiral galaxy of type (R)SB(rs)0/a located in the constellation Pisces. It was first discovered on October 8, 1861 by Heinrich d'Arrest (and later listed as NGC 447); it was also seen in the 1890s by Edward Emerson Barnard (and later listed as IC 1656). It was described by Dreyer as "faint, pretty large, brighter middle, 11th magnitude star to northeast."

References

External links
 

0447
18611008
Pisces (constellation)
Spiral galaxies
004550